A.D.M. College for Women, is a women's general degree college located in Nagapattinam, Tamil Nadu. It was established in the year 1975. The college is affiliated with Bharathidasan University. This college offers different courses in arts, commerce and science.

Departments

Science

Physics
Chemistry
Mathematics
Statistics
Computer Science
Biochemistry
Botany
Zoology
Geology

Arts and Commerce

Tamil
English
History
Economics
Commerce

Accreditation
The college is  recognized by the University Grants Commission (UGC).

References

External links
https://www.adjadmc.ac.in

Educational institutions established in 1975
1975 establishments in Tamil Nadu
Colleges affiliated to Bharathidasan University
Universities and colleges in Tiruchirappalli